Clarkston is a city in Asotin County, Washington, United States. It is part of the Lewiston, ID-WA metropolitan area, and is located west of Lewiston, Idaho, across the Snake River.

The population of Clarkston was 7,161 at the 2020 census.

Walla Walla Community College opened a branch campus in Clarkston that serves the surrounding area.

Clarkston's ZIP code, 99403, is the highest numerically in the contiguous United States.

History

Clarkston was first settled in 1862 by Robert Bracken, and was officially incorporated on August 14, 1902. Before becoming an official town, the area was known by various names, including Jawbone Flats, Lewiston, and Concord (after Concord, Massachusetts).

The name Clarkston is a reference to William Clark, of the Lewis and Clark Expedition fame. Directly east across the Snake River is Lewiston, named for Meriwether Lewis and the larger and older of the two cities. The expedition passed westbound through the area by canoe in 1805 on October 10; neither Lewis nor Clark ever visited the Clarkston side of the river. Eastbound, they returned to the area in early May 1806.

Geography
Clarkston is in the Lewis-Clark Valley, at the confluence of the Snake and Clearwater rivers. Immediately across the Snake River from Clarkston is the city of Lewiston, Idaho.

Education
There are four public elementary schools in Clarkston: Parkway Elementary School, Grantham Elementary School, Heights Elementary School, and Highland Elementary School.  

Clarkston also has one 4 year high-school teaching grade 9-12, Charles Francis Adams High School. The school has a population of 800-850 students, with over 100 staff members. It has a library, a football field, a performing arts stage, and a tennis court.

Clarkston is also home to Holy Family Catholic School, a Kindergarten through 8th grade school.

Climate
This region experiences hot and dry summers, with average monthly temperatures in the upper-80s to mid-90s, but some days reach . The unofficial record high, set in June of 2021, was 122.9 degrees Fahrenheit (50.5 degrees Celsius).

According to the Köppen Climate Classification system, Clarkston has a warm-summer Mediterranean climate, abbreviated "Csb" on climate maps.

Demographics

2010 census
As of the census of 2010, there were 7,229 people, 3,226 households, and 1,744 families living in the city. The racial makeup of the city was 92.1% White, 0.7% African American, 2.1% Native American, 0.7% Asian, 0.1% Pacific Islander, 1.2% from other races, and 3.1% from two or more races. Hispanic or Latino of any race were 4.0% of the population.

There were 3,226 households, of which 28.4% had children under the age of 18 living with them, 33.1% were married couples living together, 16.0% had a female householder with no husband present, 5.0% had a male householder with no wife present, and 45.9% were non-families. 38.3% of all households were made up of individuals, and 15.2% had someone living alone who was 65 years of age or older. The average household size was 2.20 and the average family size was 2.88.

The median age in the city was 37.7 years. 22.7% of residents were under the age of 18; 10.1% were between the ages of 18 and 24; 25.1% were from 25 to 44; 25.2% were from 45 to 64; and 16.9% were 65 years of age or older. The gender makeup of the city was 47.4% male and 52.6% female.

2000 census
As of the census of 2000, there were 7,337 people, 3,120 households, and 1,790 families living in the city. The racial makeup of the city was 94.43% White, 0.34% African American, 1.61% Native American, 0.65% Asian, 0.03% Pacific Islander, 0.79% from other races, and 2.15% from two or more races. Hispanic or Latino of any race were 2.56% of the population.

There were 3,120 households, out of which 29.9% had children under the age of 18 living with them, 37.1% were married couples living together, 15.7% had a female householder with no husband present, and 42.6% were non-families. 35.7% of all households were made up of individuals, and 15.6% had someone living alone who was 65 years of age or older. The average household size was 2.26 and the average family size was 2.92.

In the city, the age distribution of the population shows 25.7% under the age of 18, 9.7% from 18 to 24, 26.6% from 25 to 44, 20.0% from 45 to 64, and 18.0% who were 65 years of age or older. The median age was 36 years. For every 100 females, there were 86.9 males. For every 100 females age 18 and over, there were 79.3 males.

The median income for a household in the city was $25,907, and the median income for a family was $32,093. Males had a median income of $31,434 versus $20,654 for females. The per capita income for the city was $14,673. About 15.5% of families and 20.6% of the population were below the poverty line, including 27.6% of those under age 18 and 8.1% of those age 65 or over.

Port
The Port Of Clarkston is home to one of the largest cranes on a navigable waterway east of Portland. Agriculture is a major industry in the area and the port handles a lot of barge traffic carrying grains. The paper company Clearwater Paper Corporation transports wood chips and sawdust via barges for use at a Lewiston manufacturing plant. Due to its inland location on the Snake River, the port handles goods headed out to Portland-Vancouver, and inland to distributors upstream.

The port's marina has accommodations for personal boats and yachts, many of which travel through the nearby Hells Canyon.

References

External links

 City website
 History of Clarkston at HistoryLink

Cities in Asotin County, Washington
Cities in Washington (state)
Lewiston–Clarkston metropolitan area
1862 establishments in Washington Territory